The De Gasperi VI Cabinet held office in the Italian Republic from 27 January 1950 until 26 July 1951, a total of 558 days, or 1 year, 5 months and 29 days.

Party breakdown
 Christian Democracy (DC): Prime minister, 12 ministers, 23 undersecretaries
 Socialist Party of Italian Workers (PSLI): 3 ministers, 4 undersecretaries
 Italian Republican Party (PRI): 2 ministers, 2 undersecretaries
 Independents: 1 minister

Composition

References 

Italian governments
1950 establishments in Italy
1951 disestablishments in Italy
Cabinets established in 1950
Cabinets disestablished in 1951
De Gasperi 6 Cabinet